Sakaguchi Kiichiro was a Japanese anti-war activist and a sailor. He joined the Imperial Japanese Navy. During his service, he was active in anti-war activity. The Kiichiro Sakaguchi monument was erected in Izumi City, his place of birth. Amongst those who visited the monument was Japanese Communist Party politician Yoshiki Yamashita. On December 7, 2013, a rally was held at the Izumi City Community Center on the 80th anniversary of Sakaguchi's death.

See also
Dissent in the Armed Forces of the Empire of Japan

References

External links

Japanese anti-war activists
Imperial Japanese Navy officers